St. John's Catholic Church, established in 1834, is an historic Roman Catholic parish church in Worcester, Massachusetts.  It is the oldest established Catholic religious institution in the city, and the oldest Catholic parish in New England outside of Boston. On March 5, 1980, its 1845 church building was added to the National Register of Historic Places.

History

Early establishment
Catholics immigrated to the Worcester area as early as 1826. Most of them were Irish people hired to build the railroads and the Blackstone Canal. When they first settled, they had no clergy with them. Since all of the churches were Protestant, Robert Laverty, a private citizen, petitioned Bishop Benedict Fenwick of Boston to assign a priest to celebrate mass in Worcester.

In result, Father James Fitton, a Boston native, visited Worcester monthly starting in 1834. He laid the foundation for a church on Front Street, known as "Christ's Church". That structure was completed in 1836 and served as a church, rectory, Sunday school, and infirmary.

After 2,000 parishioners had joined the church, a new building was needed. The current building, listed on the National Register of Historic Places, was constructed at number 44 Temple Street in 1845 and dedicated in honor of St. John in 1846.

Besides that building, Father Fitton established Mount Saint James Seminary, which became the College of the Holy Cross in 1839. The Society of Jesus bought the school in 1843, and still own and operate it today.

From 1836-48, the Penobscot Indians visited the church each winter from Maine.

Mother Church of Springfield 
The current presbytery in use was built in 1865. When the Diocese of Springfield was established in 1870, Father Patrick T. O'Reilly was appointed the first Bishop of Springfield. He made the house the chancery for Springfield, and kept his pastorship at St. John's.

Mother Church of Worcester 
When the Worcester Diocese was established in 1950, St. John's was (and still is) known as "The Mother Church of the Diocese". However, because of the architectural elements, St. Paul's Parish on Chatham Street was selected as the cathedral for the See of Worcester.

Tradition 
A Novena of Grace in honor of St. Francis Xavier had been held every March 4–12 since 1922.

The first charismatic prayer group in Worcester began meeting in 1970. The group is still active.

A vigil mass at 9:15 PM on Saturday has been held from the 1980s to 2008.

"Preserve the Flame"
On Labor Day weekend in 2004, the interior ceiling collapsed into the sanctuary, destroying the altar and baptistry. Mass was celebrated that weekend on the parish lawn and from thenceforth at sister parish, Ascension Church, on Vernon Street, until the beginning of 2005. That weekend, masses were moved to the basement church, where space was limited. All celebrations of Confirmation and First Communion were moved to St. Paul's Cathedral to accommodate the large crowd.

The renovations were complete in September 2005 and the Mass of Rededication was celebrated on October 15, 2005 by Bishop Robert J. McManus.

List of pastors 

Rev. James Fitton 1834–1843
Rev. Adolphus Williamson 1843–1845
Rev. Matthew W. Gibson 1845–1856
Rev. John Boyce 1856–1864
Most Rev. Patrick T. O’Reilly, D.D. 1864–1885
Rt. Rev. Msgr. Thomas Griffin, D.D. P.R. 1885–1910
Rev. Thomas S. Donohue, P.R. 1911–1922
Rev. Edward J. Fitzgerald, P.R. 1923–1937
Rev. John F. McDonnell, P.R. 1937–1944
Rev. Michael E. Lahey, P.R. 1944–1953
Rev. John Donohue 1954–1963
Rt. Rev. Msgr. John J. O’Brien 1964–1967
Rev. James B. Kelly (Priest-in-charge) 1967–1971
Most Rev. Timothy J. Harrington 1969–1972*
Rev. William W. McGovern (administrator) 1971–1972
Rev. Cyril A. LeBeau 1972–1977
Rt. Rev. Msgr. Francis J. Scollen (administrator) 1977–1982; (pastorate) 1983–1984
Rev. Michael G. Foley 1984–1991
Rev. Charles F. Monroe 1991–1994
Rev. Joseph A. Coonan 1994–2008**
Rev. John F. Madden (administrator) 2004–2008; (pastorate) 2008–present 
Rev. Richard A. Jakubauskas (chaplain for the Lithuanian community) 2008–present

Notes
 * Bishop Harrington was in residence from 1969–1972, and not the pastor. ** Fr. Coonan was placed on administrative leave, then on medical leave. Fr. Madden has actually been running the parish since 2004.

Architectural style 
The church is constructed like a Baptist or Puritan church, so that visitors may think that the building is a Protestant church. The current steeple has been in place since 1951. The brick walls have been in place since the beginning in 1846.

The interior walls have been repainted several times, most recently in 2005. The congregation has 50 rows of 4 pews (total lower seating 1,000), including a handicapped section. There are another thousand pews in a balcony on both sides of the nave, including 500 people per side. The total capacity is 2,000 persons and 100 musicians.

In the sanctuary, the high altar is located in the center, with the Blessed Sacrament located behind it. The original Tridentine Mass altar houses the tabernacle, and is in Romanesque style. The pulpit is to the left of the altar and the presider's chair at the right. To the direct left, a devotional shrine is dedicated to the Sacred Heart of Jesus, and often other statues, such as of St. Francis Xavier and St. Theresa, may be displayed. The baptistry dedicated to the Blessed Virgin Mary is at the direct right. The flooring is hardwood.

Basement church 
The basement church is half the basement foundation. Confraternity of Christian Doctrine classes are taught in a format to "practice" for the "real church". The Blessed Sacrament is lit only at mass time. The "chapel" has a pre-Vatican II altar rail without the gate. The tabernacle is to the right of the altar, but the high altar is at the center with a bench as the "Novus Ordo" mass location. It is not nailed to the floor, which is marble.

Staff 
Rev. John F. Madden, Pastor
Rev. Richard A. Jakubauskas, Lithuanian Chaplain
Msgr. Edmond T. Tinsley, Assisting Priest
Dianne Gustowski, Religious Education Coordinator
Dr. Sean Redrow, Organist and Director of Music Ministry
David M. Moulton, Organist and Asst. Director of Music Ministry
Lucia Clemente Falco, Organist
John LeDoux, Musician
Jane Rabion, Safe Environment Coordinator
Jean Grenier, Altar Server Director Emeritus

See also
 List of Catholic churches in the United States
National Register of Historic Places listings in northwestern Worcester, Massachusetts
National Register of Historic Places listings in Worcester County, Massachusetts

References

External links 

 St. John's Church Official Web Site
 St. John's 175th Anniversary Celebration
 Diocese of Worcester Website

Irish-American culture in Massachusetts
J
Churches on the National Register of Historic Places in Massachusetts
Religious organizations established in 1834
Roman Catholic churches in Worcester, Massachusetts
1834 establishments in Massachusetts
National Register of Historic Places in Worcester, Massachusetts
Roman Catholic churches completed in 1845